Shock of the Hour is the debut album by rapper MC Ren, released November 16, 1993, on Ruthless Records and distributed by Relativity Records.

Background 
After the success of his debut EP Kizz My Black Azz, a follow-up album was promised for an early 1993 release. The EP, which had gone platinum after two months, was released as a promotion for the upcoming album, to be titled Life Sentence. However, in the middle of the recording of the Life Sentence album, MC Ren suddenly joined the Nation of Islam and converted to Islam with the help of his DJ and friend DJ Train. With a different outlook on the world, MC Ren scrapped the Life Sentence album, changing the name to Shock of the Hour and started to record new songs for the album. However, he kept some previously recorded songs and used them for the first half of the album, while the second half contained songs recorded after he converted to Islam, resulting in thematic differences between the albums' halves, not unlike Ice Cube's 1991 album Death Certificate.

Content

Lyrics 
The first half were songs recorded before MC Ren joined the Nation of Islam. This half deals with social issues like ghetto life, drug addiction, racism and poverty. The lead single, "Same Old Shit", strips away any pretense of glamour around the gangsta lifestyle and outlines the brutality, paranoia and violence at its core. The second single, "Fuck What Ya Heard", tells people not to listen to rumors and to be critical on what they hear. Also featured on the album is "One False Move", which is a diss track aimed at Tweedy Bird Loc.

The second half kicks off with "Mayday On The Frontline", which appeared on the soundtrack for the film CB4. "Attack on Babylon" prophesies a judgment day for modern America in which the races will be called to war in armed combat, while the title track foresees the nation's fiery end in an apocalyptic fury enabling black people to finally achieve justice. "Do You Believe" questions black Christianity considering black history and everything that has happened. It also questions interracial relationships.

Production 
The majority of the album's production was handled by Tootie and Dr. Jam. Other producers like Rhythum D and Madness 4 Real produced one song each. Tootie, who is the brother of DJ Train, produced six tracks, while Dr. Jam produced four tracks. The producers managed to create an interesting musical backdrop for Ren's dark verses, operating completely independent of Dr. Dre's g-funk sound that was taking over the West Coast in ‘93. The album moves at a steady midtempo funk with rumbling bass, rough percussion and whiny synths. It's effective in that it's a dark and often powerful sound, but it's also somewhat faceless and industrial-sounding. The beats are focused to the point that a few sound too similar, but overall it is a memorable listen from a musical standpoint.

Album title 
The title of the album is a reference made to a speech by Nation of Islam minister Louis Farrakhan called "The Shock of the Hour".

Singles 
Two singles were released from the album: "Same Ol' Shit" and "Fuck What Ya Heard". "Same Ol' Shit was released as the first single on October 29, 1993 and was produced by Tootie. It peaked at number ninety on the Billboard Hot 100, number sixty-two on the Hot R&B/Hip-Hop Singles & Tracks and number eleven Hot Rap Singles. "Same Ol' Shit" became MC Ren's most successful single chart-wise by making it to #90 on the Billboard Hot 100, his only single to make it to that chart.

"Fuck What Ya Heard" was released as the second single on April 26, 1994 and was produced by Dr. Jam. The single did not enter any chart, but a music video was shot for the single.

Release and reception

Critical reception 

Upon its release, Shock of the Hour was met with generally positive reviews from music critics. Ron Wynn of AllMusic stated, "M.C. Ren's debut LP is uneven, but at least presents a lyrical vision when it's not spewing out familiar, tired, sexist cliches about women." Entertainment Weekly magazine's James Bernard mentioned that "On Shock of the Hour, Ren’s raps still sound as commanding as they did on Niggaz4Life, and the musical production is a pretty decent rendition of Dr. Dre’s patented slow, ominous gangsta funk". Jonathan Gold of Los Angeles Times noted "Shock of the Hour is a small, ugly masterpiece of gangsta rap" and went on to say "Ren’s deep-voiced, brutal rhyming is as menacing, as portentous of violence, as anything a horror-film director ever set up". The Source magazine gave the album a 3.5/5 mic rating. It said aside from Ren's talented flow and menacingly distinctive voice, the album's greatest asset comes with the production.

The album also received some negative criticism. Village Voice critic Robert Christgau gave the album a "Must to Avoid" rating, which signifies "On side one he [Ren] brutalizes black people, especially but by no means exclusively black women, Then to cover his tracks, he turns around and spouts the most ignorant, racist Afrocentric bullshit yet to hit the charts.

Commercial performance 
The album peaked number one on Billboard R&B and twenty-two on the Billboard 200 chart, with a first-month sales of 321,000 copies in the United States.

Track listing

Personnel

Lorenzo Jerald Patterson - primary artist, performer, producer
Craig A. Miller - performer
Laywiy - performer
Badd Newz - performer
Da Konvicted Felon - performer
Dollar Bill - performer
Don Jaguar - performer
The Whole Click - performer
Dr. Jam - producer, mixing
Tootie - producer
DJ Train - producer
Mark (Fingaz) Dixon - Keyboards (Same Ol')
René "The Secret Weapon" Flores - Bass

Eric Lynn Wright - executive producer
David Weldon - producer
Juvenile - producer
Madness 4 Real - producer
Donovan the Dirt Biker - engineer, mixing
Bob Morse - engineer, mixing
David Weldon - engineer
Daniel Arsenault - photography

Charts

Weekly charts

Year-end charts

Singles

See also
List of number-one R&B albums of 1993 (U.S.)

References

MC Ren albums
1993 debut albums
Ruthless Records albums
Relativity Records albums
Albums produced by Rhythum D
Political hip hop albums